Lithuania competed at the 2005 World Aquatics Championships in Montreal, Quebec, Canada.

Swimming

6 swimmers represented Lithuania:

Men

References

Nations at the 2005 World Aquatics Championships
2005 in Lithuanian sport
Lithuania at the World Aquatics Championships